Salem Abdullah (Arabic:سالم عبد الله) (born 18 February 1984) is an Emirati footballer. He currently plays for Masafi as a goalkeeper.

References

External links
 

Emirati footballers
1984 births
Living people
Al Shabab Al Arabi Club Dubai players
Al-Nasr SC (Dubai) players
Al-Wasl F.C. players
Masfout Club players
Masafi Club players
UAE Pro League players
UAE First Division League players
Place of birth missing (living people)
Association football goalkeepers